Hjálmar Þórarinsson (born 16 February 1986, in Reykjavík) is an Icelandic footballer currently playing as a striker for Berserkir.

Þórarinsson started his career with Þróttur in his native Iceland before moving to Hearts in October 2004, initially on loan. Displaying a combination of pace and power, he impressed the Tynecastle coaching staff enough in U21 and first team appearances to earn a permanent contract in May 2005. The highlight of this spell for Þórarinsson was a last minute equaliser in the Scottish League Cup semi-final against Motherwell, which Hearts eventually lost 3–2 after extra time.

An influx of established international forwards in the summer of 2005, such as Edgaras Jankauskas and Roman Bednář, ensured Þórarinsson did not feature in the Hearts first team in 2005–06. After a season of U21 football, he moved to Raith Rovers on loan until November 2006. He signed a further loan deal in January 2007, returning to Iceland with Fram until September.

References

External links

Profile at londonhearts.com

Living people
1986 births
Hjalmar Thorarinsson
Hjalmar Thorarinsson
Heart of Midlothian F.C. players
Raith Rovers F.C. players
Hjalmar Thorarinsson
Scottish Premier League players
Expatriate footballers in Scotland
Association football forwards